The Final Architecture is a series of science fiction novels by Adrian Tchaikovsky. As of 2022, it comprises Shards of Earth and Eyes of the Void, with a final volume entitled Lords of Uncreation expected to be published in 2023. The series focuses on a group of humans fighting against the mysterious Architects, who destroy inhabited planets. The series has been well-received critically, with Shards of Earth winning the 2021 BSFA Award for Best Novel.

Plot

Premise

The Architects are moon-sized creatures who destroy inhabited planets, including Earth. They will not attack planets with ruins from the mysterious Originator civilization. Only the Essiel, a species of aliens, know how to move Originator artifacts without destroying this protective effect. Many human colony planets vote to join the Essiel Hegemony in exchange for protection against the Architects.

Humans invent Intermediaries, a modified form of human that can fight Architects. Intermediary Idris Telemmier helps kill an Architect at Berlenhof, turning the tide of the conflict decades after the destruction of Earth. Later, he and other Intermediaries make contact with an Architect, which seems to notice humanity for the first time. After this, all of the Architects mysteriously disappear.

Shards of Earth

Decades later, conflict arises between the Parthenon (an all-female group of clones) and the Council of Human Interests, or Hugh. Myrmidon Executor Solace is ordered to find Idris and convince him to join the Parthenon. Idris is working as a salvager on the spaceship Vulture God. The crew also includes Olli, a disabled human who moves with the help of a device called the Scorpion, as well as Kittering, the crew's accountant and a member of the Hannilambra species. Solace helps save Idris from a kidnapping attempt and temporarily joins the crew.

Vulture God is hired by the Hegemony to search for a lost ship called the Oumaru. They find that it has been attacked by Architects. Both ships are then hijacked by the Broken Harvest crime syndicate, which is based out of the Hegemony. The crew follows Broken Harvest to the planet Tarekuma, where they reclaim their ship. In the process, they discover that the Oumaru was carrying Originator artifacts, which could protect an entire planet from Architects. They fly to the planet Jericho, where an archaeologist named Trine verifies the box’s authenticity. Broken Harvest attempts to kidnap the crew again, and eventually catches them near Berlenhof, capital of Hugh.

The Parthenon arrives to rescue Vulture God’s crew from Broken Harvest. As the Parthenon and Hugh fight over the fate of Idris and the Originator relics, an Architect appears at Berlenhof. The Parthenon and Idris take the artifacts to meet it. The Architect takes the artifacts from the ship. Idris manages to contact the Architect and learns that some unknown force is directing them to destroy inhabited planets. The Architect leaves the system. Idris and the crew agree to join the Parthenon, hoping to create a new group of Intermediaries before the Architects return.

Major themes

Paul Weimer wrote that Shards of Earth explores the concept of diaspora and refugees. After the destruction of Earth, the humans in the book become part of an "unwilling diaspora". Weimer writes that this concept has been explored in different ways by other science fiction works, including Anvil of Stars by Greg Bear, the Queendom of Sol series by Wil McCarthy, and both versions of Battlestar Galactica. Weimer writes that exploring these concepts encourages readers to think about the treatment of modern-day refugees who are fleeing from "war, disease, famine, [and] economic privation."

Style

Shards of Earth is narrated from several different perspectives, most notably those of Idris and Solace.

According to reviewer Russell Letson, Shards of Earth contains three MacGuffins: the salvaged ship indicating the return of the Architects, a container of potent alien artifacts, and Idris himself. The novel is divided into five parts, one for each of the planetary systems visited. He also wrote that the series as a whole "belongs to what might be called a meta-genre". Letson compares the horror of unspace to motifs wound in the works of H.P. Lovecraft and Algernon Blackwood, among others. He also compared the series to The Expanse by James S.A. Corey, noting that both works contained "space operatics, down-and-dirty noir and intrigue elements, band-of-comrades adventure, gothic spookiness, alien weirdness, special-effects-go-boom sequences, and mysteries that could well remain mysterious when all is finally wrapped up."

In a review for Strange Horizons, Stephen Case wrote that Tchaikovsky organized Shards of Earth into "layers" of worldbuilding. In the first layer, Tchaikovsky develops the individual characters, primarily the crew members of the Vulture God. Each character serves as a "window into the broader universe". In the second layer, Tchaikovsky explores conflict between human factions. For example, conflict between Hugh and the Parthenon is examined through the characters of Idris and Solace. In the third and final layer, the novel explores "the ineffable... and utterly ungraspable" scale of the Architects.

Reception

Publishers Weekly gave Shards of Earth a starred review, calling it "dazzlingly suspenseful" and "space opera at its best". In a review for Grimdark Magazine, Carrie Chi Lough praised the novel's nuanced characterization of the Intermediaries and the Partheni, and called the novel "the paragon of epic space operas". In a review for Locus, Russell Letson praised Shards of Earth as an example of "recombinant sci-fi" because it combines several large ideas into a "busy, complicated, surprising [concoction]." Letson praised the story's grand scope as well as its use of common tropes in novel ways. A review in New Scientist praised the psychological exploration of "unspace", but felt that the story was sometimes "hard to follow" due to the number of alien species, planets, and characters. Shards of Earth also won the 2021 British Science Fiction Award for Best Novel.

Publishers Weekly wrote a positive review for Eyes of the Void, stating that the author's "intelligent worldbuilding captures the essence of classic space opera". The review also called the plot "humorous, sometimes convoluted, but always memorable". In an article for Grimdark Magazine, Carrie Chi Lough praised Tchaikovsky's ability to give authenticity to the "truly outlandish aliens", while noting that the second book "did read as more of a setup piece for the third book in the series".

References

British science fiction novels
Faster-than-light travel in fiction
Hard science fiction
Science fiction novel series